Sant'Anna may refer to:

Places

Italy 
 Sant'Anna Arresi, Sardinia
 Sant'Anna d'Alfaedo, Province of Verona
 Sant'Anna di Stazzema, Tuscany; the site of the Sant'Anna di Stazzema massacre during World War II
 Boschi Sant'Anna, Veneto

Churches 
 Sant'Anna, Alcamo, church in Alcamo
 Sant'Anna, Brugherio, small church in a town in Monza and Brianza, Italy
 Sant'Anna al Capo, church in Palermo, Sicily, Italy
 Sant'Anna a Capuana, church in Naples, Italy
 Sant'Anna, Genoa, church and monastery in region of Liguria, Italy
 Sant'Anna, Lendinara, church in Lendinara, Italy
 Sant'Anna dei Lombardi, church and monastic complex in Naples, Italy
 Sant'Anna la Misericordia, church and former monastery in Palermo, Italy
 Sant'Anna dei Palafrenieri, church in Rome, Italy
 Sant'Anna di Palazzo, church in Naples, Italy
 Sant'Anna, Piacenza, church in Piacenza, Italy
 Sant'Anna, Qrendi (Kappella ta' Sant'Anna), oratory in Qrendi, Malta
 Sant'Anna, Sessa Aurunca, church in province of Caserta, Campania, Italy
 Sant'Anna, Spello, church in province of Perugia, Umbria, Italy
 Sant'Anna, Trani, church in Apulia, Italy
 Sant'Anna al Trivio, church in Naples

People 
Saint Anne, the mother of Mary (mother of Jesus) in the Catholic tradition
Affonso Romano de Sant'Anna (born 1937), Brazilian writer
Moraci Sant'anna (born 1951), Brazilian football manager
Sérgio Sant'Anna (1941–2020), Brazilian writer

Other 
 Sant'Anna Airport, near Crotone in Calabria, Italy
 Sant'Anna di Isola Capo Rizzuto rosso o rosato, a Calabrian wine
 Sant'Anna School of Advanced Studies, University of Pisa
 Sant'Anna (river), in southern Sicily